The Athens Aeros are a Canadian Junior ice hockey team in Athens, Ontario.  They play in the Eastern Ontario Junior Hockey League. A 53 year-old franchise, with a never ending feed of talented young hockey players moving through the program.  The Aeros finished the 2019-20 campaign 0-44, and held a 48 game losing streak before a 6-3 win on October 6, 2021.

Season-by-season results

External links
Aeros Webpage
CCHL2 Webpage

Eastern Ontario Junior B Hockey League teams
Ice hockey clubs established in 1968